Forever Mandalay is a 2014 Burmese drama television series. It is a story of Mandalay. It aired on MRTV-4, from February 10 to April 9, 2014, on Mondays to Fridays at 19:15 for 43 episodes.

Cast

Main
Aung Min Khant as Phone Moe Thun
Chue Lay as Ngwe Yi Hnin Sat
 Nay Aung as U Phone Kyaw Shein, grandfather of Phone Moe Thun
Moht Moht Myint Aung as Daw Khin Hnin Si. Her other name is Daw Khin Khin Oo.
 Han Lin Thant as Phone Kyaw Shein, U Phone Kyaw Shein's young life
 May Mi Kyaw Kyaw as Khin Hnin Si, Daw Khin Hnin Si's young life
May Than Nu as Daw Khin Hnin Yi, mother of Ngwe Yi Hnin Sat
 May Thinzar Oo as Daw Thet Htar Nyo, grandmother of Phone Moe Thun
Myat Thu Thu as Mar Lar
Aung Yay Chan as Tay Zar Aung
Nat Khat as Nay Soe Moe
 Ju Jue Kay as Poe Ngon Phu, Poe Poe

Supporting
 Zin Myo as Zaw Htet
 Kyaw Hsu as Kyaw Mya
 Kyaw Htet as Wunna
 Zu Zu Zan as Yamin Khin
 Lin Myat as Chit Thaw
 Sai Nay Phyo as Ye Naung
 Khin Sandar Myint as Aye Hla
 Than Than Soe as Daw Shwe Win Yee
 Zaw Win Naing as U Kyaw Mya
 Eant Min Nyo as Kyaw Yee
 War War Aung as Daw Khin Thitsar
 Mone as Toe Toe
 Chit Sa Yar as U Thein Aung
 Lu Mone as U Tin Maung Shein
 Aung Khaing

References

Burmese television series
MRTV (TV network) original programming